Wilson Nyabong Ijang (born 2 January 1959) is a Malaysian politician. He is the member of Sarawak State Legislative Assembly for Pelagus constituency in Sarawak, Malaysia since 2016 representing Parti Rakyat Sarawak (PRS), then was part of Barisan Nasional (BN) and now Sarawak Parties Alliance (GPS). Following the fall of BN in the 2018 general election and in the aftermath of meeting between all Sarawak-based BN coalition parties including PRS on 12 June 2018, had decided to leave the coalition to form a new Sarawak-based coalition of GPS. He was first elected after winning a majority at DUN Pelagus in the 11th Sarawak State Election 2016. He is now in his second term after winning a majority in the 12th Sarawak State Election 2021. He is currently a supreme council member of local ruling party, PRS.

From 2010 to 2016 he served as Sarawak Political Secretary to the Chief Minister. He is a former Petronas officer in supply chain department, graduated with Advanced Diploma in Logistics and Transport Management at The Chartered Institute of Logistics and Transport (CILT-UK) in United Kingdom as well as Electrical Power Engineering from Mara Technical Institute, Kuala Lumpur.

Election results

Honours
  :
  Member of the Order of the Defender of the Realm (AMN) (2010)
  Officer of the Order of the Defender of the Realm (KMN) (2014)
  :
  Companion of the Most Exalted Order of the Star of Sarawak (JBS) (2021)

References

1959 births
Living people
People from Sarawak
Members of the Sarawak State Legislative Assembly
21st-century Malaysian politicians